This is a list of the main career statistics of professional tennis player Steffi Graf.

Performance timelines

''Only results in WTA Tour (incl. Grand Slams) main-draw, Olympic Games and Fed Cup are included in win–loss records.

Singles

Notes:
 Only results in WTA Tour (incl. Grand Slams) main-draw, Olympic Games and Fed Cup are included in win–loss records.
 Graf retired in August 1999 while ranked world No. 3, She was not included in the official year end ranking.

Doubles

Grand Slam finals

Singles: 31 (22 titles, 9 runner-ups)

Doubles: 4 (1 title, 3 runner-ups)

Year-end championship finals

Singles: 6 (5 titles, 1 runner-up)

Olympic finals

Singles: 2 (1 gold, 1 silver medal)

Graf also won the 1984 demonstration event at the 1984 Los Angeles Games, but this was for players aged 21 or under, and it was not an official Olympic event.

Doubles

Graf and Kohde-Kilsch lost in the semifinals to Jana Novotná and Helena Suková 7–5, 6–3. In 1988, there was no bronze medal match, and both beaten semifinalists received bronze medals.

Category 5 / Tier I finals

Singles: 37 (26 titles, 11 runner-ups)

Doubles: 4 (2 titles, 2 runner-ups)

WTA singles titles: 107

WTA doubles titles: 11

WTA singles runner–ups: (31)

WTA doubles runner–ups (7)

Fed Cup

Wins (2)

Participations (32)

Singles (22)

Doubles (10)

WTA Tour career earnings

Head-to-head vs. top 10 ranked players

Top 10 wins
Graf has a  record against players who were, at the time the match was played, ranked in the top 10.

Double bagel matches (6-0, 6-0)

Awards
1986: Most Improved Player, by the Women's Tennis Association (WTA)
1987 Player of the Year, by the WTA
1987 World Champion, by the International Tennis Federation (ITF)
1988 Player of the Year, by the WTA
1988 World Champion, by the ITF
1988 BBC Overseas Sports Personality of the Year
1989 Player of the Year, by the WTA
1989 World Champion, by the ITF
1989 Female Athlete of the Year, by the Associated Press
1990 Player of the Year, by the WTA
1990 World Champion, by the ITF
1993 Player of the Year, by the WTA
1993 World Champion, by the ITF
1994 Player of the Year, by the WTA
1995 Player of the Year, by the WTA
1995 World Champion, by the ITF
1996 Player of the Year, by the WTA
1996 World Champion, by the ITF
1996 Most Exciting Player of the Year, by the WTA
1998 Most Exciting Player of the Year, by the WTA
1999 Most Exciting Player of the Year, by the WTA
1999 Prince of Asturias Award, one of the most important awards of Spain and named after the heir apparent of Spain, Prince Felipe
1999 Germany Television Award for her outstanding performance as tennis player and her importance to the German public.
1999 Athlete of the Century for the category Female Athlete in Ballsports by a panel of the International Olympic Committee (IOC)
1999 The Greatest Female Tennis Player of the 20th century, by a panel of tennis experts assembled by the Associated Press
1999 Female Athlete of the Year, by the German television broadcaster ARD
1999 Female Sports Award of the Last Decade, by ESPY
1999 Olympic Order granted by Dr. Antonio Samaranch, president of the IOC
2002 Medal of Honor, bestowed by the prime minister of Graf's home state Baden-Württemberg, Erwin Teufel
2004 Inducted into the International Tennis Hall of Fame
2008 Cross of the Order of Merit awarded to her by German Federal President Horst Köhler
2009 Wilson award for public service.

Special honours
 Graf is the only female athlete in the list of Forbes Top-30 Most recognizable and marketable athletes in 1995.
 Selected for European Heroes in 2004 and 2005 by TIME Magazine.
 Voted Germans greatest role model by TV14 magazine, 2004.
 Voted Most admirable German woman by Amica magazine, 2005.
 Voted Germany's Sportswoman of the Century in 1999 by the German press.
 Graf is the only person to have won the 'Golden Slam' (1988)
 Graf is the first German to win the Spain's 'Prince of Asturias' award.
 Chosen by World Economic Forum As Young Global Leader for 2008
 Godmother of the Navigator of The Seas (Royal Caribbean Cruiselines), 2002
 Stefanie Graf was awarded with the Golden Sports Pyramid, the highest distinction of the German Sports Fund in Herzogenaurach by the Adidas chairman Herbert Hainer on 24 June 2008. She was also inducted to the German Sport Hall of Fame.
 Voted The best female role model in sports in a survey by Barclays, sponsors of the Premier League, 2010.
 Nominated and voted the title Mother of the nation in her country, Germany, 2010.

References

External links 
 
 
 
 

Graf, Steffi